Derek Anthony Beckley (7 October 1927 – 19 April 1980) was an English actor. A graduate of the Royal Academy of Dramatic Art, Beckley went on to carve out a career on film and television throughout the 1960s and 1970s, often playing villainous roles, as well as being a veteran of numerous stage productions.

Early life
Beckley was born in Southampton, Hampshire, England. He was a child out of wedlock and never met his father. Due to work commitments, she was often away, and Beckley was brought up mainly by another woman whom he referred to as his aunt.

When he was five years old, Beckley and his mother moved to Portsmouth and when the Second World War broke out he was sent to Winchester, where he attended boarding school at Winton House. It was in Winchester where he first became interested in acting. While his mother wanted him to do "something nice and safe", like working in the civil service, Beckley discovered that acting was what was going to make him happy when he saw a performance in Portsmouth of Emlyn Williams' The Corn is Green by the Court Players, a local repertory company.
    
Beckley left school at the age of 16 in pursuit of his acting career. He worked as a stage sweeper and tea maker for two or three months, then moved to London. As he could not get work in the theatre, he did odd jobs as a waiter and in an ice cream factory while spending his spare time watching actors like Laurence Olivier, Ralph Richardson and Alec Guinness and the Old Vic productions at the New Theatre.
 
Shortly before turning 18, he joined the Royal Navy and spent two years as a seaman aboard the destroyer , where he found the time to prepare for admission to the Royal Academy of Dramatic Art (RADA). He joined RADA on an ex-Navy grant and during his two-year training befriended people such as actress Sheila Hancock and playwright Charles Laurence.

Career
After graduating from RADA, Beckley started working for various provincial repertory companies, eventually settling with a company near London (Bromley Repertory) which opened up opportunities for television work.  After guest roles in popular TV series such as Sergeant Cork, The Saint, Z-Cars and the then revolutionary  comedy programme Dig This Rhubarb Beckley made his film debut in 1965 as Ned Poins in Orson Welles' Chimes at Midnight.

Beckley appeared in a number of films for director Peter Collinson: The Penthouse (1967); The Long Day's Dying (1968); and most memorably as Camp Freddie in The Italian Job (1969). His only starring role was as the psychotic Kenny Wemys in The Fiend (1972), and he made his last film appearance in 1979 playing another psychopath in When a Stranger Calls. His other films include The Lost Continent (1968), Get Carter (1971), Assault (1971), Sitting Target (1972), Gold (1974), and Revenge of the Pink Panther (1978).

On television, Beckley played the villainous Harrison Chase in the six-part Doctor Who serial The Seeds of Doom (1976). He also guest-starred on shows such as Manhunt, Callan, Jason King, and Special Branch.

He remained active in the theatre, appearing in the West End in Tennessee Williams' Small Craft Warnings with Elaine Stritch and in Snap with Maggie Smith.

Death
Beckley died six months after the premiere of When a Stranger Calls. Just before his death he had been signed for further work in the US. He was supposed to co-star with Elizabeth Montgomery in a television movie titled My Fat Friend and appear in a film, American Dreamer. He was also to appear in the NBC miniseries Beulah Land alongside Lesley Ann Warren, Don Johnson and others.

The cause of his death was given as cancer (brain tumour) but appeared "mysterious".  According to his friend Sheila Hancock it could have been AIDS, a disease then almost unknown.  Beckley died at the Medical Center of the University of California in Los Angeles  and is buried at the Hollywood Forever Cemetery.

Personal life
In an interview in 1979, Beckley stated that there was nothing in his background to explain why he became an actor except for possibly "a desire for some attention, which I really didn't get much as a kid."

While often playing villains and psychopaths on screen, Beckley is described as friendly and funny by people who met him and as someone who could tell a good story. Beckley remarked that he would be surprised if people could find anything psychotic in his behaviour.

For more than 15 years, Beckley was in a relationship with film producer Barry Krost. When Krost opened his own management company, Beckley became his first client.  Krost also produced Beckley's last film When a Stranger Calls and was a production associate on The Penthouse.

Although he kept a house in Fulham, London and had three dogs, Beckley spent time living in California during the last year of his life in an apartment in West Hollywood.

Filmography

Film

Television

Radio
1968 - Movie-Go-Round

Stage
???   - Five Finger Exercise
1950s - Eden's End
1956 - The Caine Mutiny Court-Martial
1957 - The Rivals
1957 - Look Back in Anger
1957 - The Teahouse of the August Moon
1957 - Night of the Ding-Dong
1958 - Brothers-in-Law
1958 - Jack and the Bean Stalk
1959 - Wolf's Clothing
1959 - The Entertainer
1959 - Bus Stop (as producer)
1959 - The Long and the Short and the Tall
1960 - Two for the See-Saw (as director)
1960 - The Taming of the Shrew
1960 - Saint Joan
1960 - Time Limit
1961 -  S. for Scandal
1961 - The Merchant of Venice (as producer)
1961 - Mother
1962 - The Bed Bug
1962 - Arden of Faversham
1962 - Diary of a Scoundrel
1962 - Infanticide in the House of Fred Ginger
1966 - Lorca
1969 - Hedda Gabler
1969 - Cages
1973 - Small Craft Warnings
1974 - Snap
1974 - The Dog Beneath the Skin

References

External links
 
 

1927 births
1980 deaths
20th-century English male actors
20th-century English LGBT people
20th-century Royal Navy personnel
Alumni of RADA
Burials at Hollywood Forever Cemetery
English gay actors
English male film actors
English male stage actors
English male television actors
Male actors from Southampton
Royal Navy sailors